is a Japanese footballer currently playing for V.League 1 club Saigon.

Statistics

Club
Updated to 23 February 2016.

References

External links

https://us.soccerway.com/players/ryutaro-karube/398439/

1992 births
Living people
Meiji University alumni
Association football people from Tokyo
Japanese footballers
J2 League players
FC Gifu players
Thanh Hóa FC players
Association football midfielders